Mohan Rai (1933 – 4 November 2013) was an Indian cricketer. He played 24 first-class matches for Madras between 1955 and 1963.

References

External links
 

1933 births
2013 deaths
Indian cricketers
Tamil Nadu cricketers
Place of birth missing